Istorychna Pravda —  is a Ukrainian online socio-historical, popular science publication. Founder and Editor-in-Chief - Vakhtang Kipiani; editors - Pavlo Solodko, Oleksandr Zinchenko, Volodymyr Birchak, Ihor Bigun, Vitaliy Skalsky.

The publication is an independent partner of Ukrayinska Pravda publishing house, but is not affiliated with the UP financially or through ownership / management mechanisms.

In August 2020, launched its own YouTube channel of the same name.

Thematic direction 
The publication publishes materials on the history of Ukraine and Ukrainians, Russians, Poles, Jews, Crimean Tatars and other ethnic groups whose destiny is connected with Ukraine. From ancient times to the present. The main emphasis, focus - on the political history of the twentieth century: the struggle for statehood, human rights, scientific and technological progress, totalitarian projects and experiments, human destinies.

During the period of existence of the publication more than 11 thousand materials of more than 600 authors have been published.

Political scientist Volodymyr Kulyk considers Istorychna Pravda: the most notable online publication with a lively contribution to the creation of Ukrainian historical memory, which publishes texts on the history of Ukraine and other countries. Where, the editors test themselves in the role of public historians, characterizing the publication as a "platform for scientific and journalistic discussions around historical politics", a "source of news" on current topics with a "repository of artifacts".

References

External links 

 The site of Istorychna Pravda
 YouTube channel of Istorychna Pravda

2010 establishments in Ukraine
Internet properties established in 2010